Sdei Avraham (lit. Avraham Fields) is a moshav in southern Israel. Located in the Hevel Shalom area of the north-western Negev desert near the Gaza Strip border, it falls under the jurisdiction of Eshkol Regional Council.

History
The moshav was founded in 1981 and was initially named Yesodot HaDarom (lit. Foundations of the South), but was later renamed after Avraham Herzfeld, a leader of Mapai.

References

Moshavim
Populated places established in 1981
Gaza envelope
Populated places in Southern District (Israel)
1981 establishments in Israel